Rey may refer to:

Rey (given name), a given name
Rey (surname), a surname
Rey (Star Wars), a character in the Star Wars films
Rey, Iran, a city in Iran
Ray County, in Tehran Province of Iran
Rey (film), a 2015 Indian film
The Rey Commission of the European Union
Rey (band), a Japanese band who perform theme songs
Corey Lewis, a comic book creator also known as "Rey"

See also

Reyes (disambiguation)
El Rey (disambiguation)
Del Rey (disambiguation)
Rei (disambiguation)